Wellard is a suburb of Perth, Western Australia, located within the City of Kwinana.

At the time of the 2011 census there were 3,246 people living in the suburb of Wellard. The ABS reported the most common responses for employed persons usually resident in Wellard were technicians and trades workers 21.7%, clerical and administrative workers 17.1%, professionals 14.9%, managers 9.3% and labourers 8.6%.

Village and shops
A joint venture between the Western Australian Department of Housing and Peet Limited since 2003, The Village at Wellard is a 320-hectare mixed-use development in the City of Kwinana that will ultimately accommodate 1,700 households.

It is Perth’s first transit-oriented development on the Perth to Mandurah rail line. Residents can reach the Perth CBD in less than 30 minutes and Mandurah in 20 minutes, while an integrated bus service provides access to the major centres of Kwinana and Rockingham.

The Wellard Train Station is at the heart of the community. A Village Centre is being developed around the Wellard Station that will contain retail, residential, commercial and community facilities, including a range of mixed-use and medium-density sites. The residential component ranges from large traditional freehold homesites to urban apartments.

A new Wellard Square shopping precinct is being designed to form a ‘main street’ linking the Train Station, and a piazza-style meeting area at one end, with a community centre at the other. Woolworths has signed a long-term lease to become the anchor tenant at Wellard Square, with a series of other brand-name retailers, specialty stores and fast food outlets to follow.

Transport links
A journey by train from Wellard Station to Perth Underground Station takes about 30 minutes. A journey from Wellard station to Mandurah station takes around 22 minutes.

Education facilities
 Peter Carnley Anglican Community School
 The King's College (formerly El Shaddai CS) 
 Wellard Primary School
 Wellard Village Primary School - Opening February 2023 

A middle school is planned in Wellard. Several well-established primary and secondary schools and TAFE facilities are also located nearby.

References

External links

Suburbs of Perth, Western Australia
Suburbs in the City of Kwinana